Gul Makai (Urdu for cornflower) may refer to:

Gul Makai, the blog of Malala Yousafzai, using a name taken from a character in a Pashtun folktale
Gul Makai (film), Indian biographical drama